is a railway station in Yukuhashi, Fukuoka Prefecture, Japan. It is on the Tagawa Line, operated by the Heisei Chikuhō Railway. Trains arrive roughly every 30 minutes.

On 1 April 2009, a construction company headquartered in nearby Miyako, acquired naming rights to the station.

Platforms

Gallery

External links
Toyotsu Station (Heisei Chikuhō Railway website)

References

Railway stations in Fukuoka Prefecture
Railway stations in Japan opened in 1895
Heisei Chikuhō Railway Tagawa Line